Coal generated about 19% of the electricity at utility-scale facilities in the United States in 2021, down from 42% in 2014.  In 2021, coal supplied  of primary energy to electric power plants, which made up 90% of coal's contribution to U.S. energy supply. Utilities buy more than 90% of the coal consumed in the United States.
There were over 200 coal powered units across the United States in 2022. Coal plants have been closing since the 2010s due to cheaper and cleaner natural gas and renewables. But environmentalists say that political action is needed to close them faster, to reduce greenhouse gas emissions by the United States to better limit climate change.

Coal has been used to generate electricity in the United States since an Edison plant was built in New York City in 1882. The first AC power station was opened by General Electric in Ehrenfeld, Pennsylvania in 1902, servicing the Webster Coal and Coke Company. By the mid-20th century, coal had become the leading fuel for generating electricity in the US. The long, steady rise of coal-fired generation of electricity shifted to a decline after 2007. The decline has been linked to the increased availability of natural gas, decreased consumption, renewable power, and more stringent environmental regulations. The Environmental Protection Agency has advanced restrictions on coal plants to counteract mercury pollution, smog, and global warming.

Trends, comparisons, and forecasts 

The average share of electricity generated from coal in the US has dropped from 52.8% in 1997 to 27.4% in 2018. In 2017, there were 359 coal-powered units at the electrical utilities across the US, with a total nominal capacity of 256 GW
(compared to 1024 units at nominal 278 GW in 2000).
The actual average generated power from coal in 2006 was 227.1 GW (1991 TWh per year), the highest in the world and still slightly ahead of China (1950 TWh per year) at that time. In 2000, the US average production of electricity from coal was 224.3 GW (1966 TWh for the year). In 2006, US electrical generation consumed  or 92.3% of the coal mined in the US.

Due to emergence of shale gas, coal consumption declined from 2009. In the first quarter of 2012, the use of coal for electricity generation declined substantially more, 21% from 2011 levels. According to the U.S. Energy Information Administration, 27 gigawatts of capacity from coal-fired generators is to be retired from 175 coal-fired power plants between 2012 and 2016. Natural gas showed a corresponding increase, increasing by a third over 2011. Coal's share of electricity generation dropped to just over 36%.  Coal use continues to decline rapidly through November 2015 with its share around 33.6%.

The coal plants are mostly base-load plants with typical utilisation rates of 50% to 60% (relating to full load hours).

Utility companies have shut down and retired aging coal-fired power plants following the Environmental Protection Agency's (EPA) implementation of the Cross-State Air Pollution Rule (CSAP). The extent of shutdowns and reduction in utilization depend on factors such as future price of natural gas and cost of installation of pollution control equipment; however, as of 2013, the future of coal-fired power plants in the United States did not appear promising. In 2014 estimates gauged that an additional 40 gigawatts (GW) of coal-fired capacity would retire until 2020, in addition to the nearly 20GW that already had retired as of 2014. This is driven most strongly by inexpensive natural gas competing with coal, and EPA's Mercury and Air Toxics Standards (MATS), which require significant reductions in emissions of mercury, acid gases, and toxic metals, scheduled to take effect in April 2015. Over 13 GW of coal power plants built between 1950 and 1970 were retired in 2015, averaging 133 MW per plant. In Texas, the price drop of natural gas has reduced the capacity factor in 7 of the state's coal plants (max. output 8 GW), and they contribute about a quarter of the state's electricity.

The cost of transporting coal may be around $20/ton for trains, or $5–6/ton for barge and truck. A 2015 study by a consortium of environmental organizations concluded that US Government subsidies for coal production are around $8/ton for the Powder River Basin.

In 2018, 16 of the 50 Federal States of the US had either no coal power in their power production for the public power supply (California, Idaho, Massachusetts, Rhode Island and Vermont), less than 5% coal in power production (Connecticut, Maine, New Hampshire, New Jersey, New York, Delaware) or between 5 and 10% (Alaska, Nevada, Mississippi, Oregon and Washington State)

Environmental impacts 

In the United States, three coal-fired power plants reported the largest toxic air releases in 2001:

 Duke Energy's Roxboro Steam Electric Plant in Semora, North Carolina. The four-unit, 2,462 megawatt facility is one of the largest power plants in the United States.
 Reliant Energy's Keystone Power Plant in Shelocta, Pennsylvania.
 Georgia Power's Bowen Steam Electric Generating Plant in Cartersville, Georgia.

The Environmental Protection Agency classified the 44 sites as potential hazards to communities, which means the waste sites could cause death and significant property damage if an event such as a storm or a structural failure caused a spill. They estimate that about 300 dry landfills and wet storage ponds are used around the country to store ash from coal-fired power plants. The storage facilities hold the noncombustible ingredients of coal and the ash trapped by equipment designed to reduce air pollution.

Acid rain 

Byproducts of coal plants have been linked to acid rain.

Sulfur dioxide emissions 
86 coal powered plants have a capacity of 107.1 GW, or 9.9% of total U.S. electric capacity, they emitted 5,389,592 tons of SO2 in 2006 – which represents 28.6% of U.S. SO2 emissions from all sources.

Carbon footprint:  emissions 

Emissions from electricity generation account for the largest share of U.S. greenhouse gases, 38.9% of U.S. production of carbon dioxide in 2006 (with transportation emissions close behind, at 31%). Although coal power only accounted for 49% of the U.S. electricity production in 2006, it was responsible for 83% of  emissions caused by electricity generation that year, or 1,970 million metric ton of  emissions.

Mercury pollution 
U.S. coal-fired electricity-generating power plants owned by utilities emitted an estimated 48 tons of mercury in 1999, the largest source of man-made mercury pollution in the U.S. In 1995–96, this accounted for 32.6% of all mercury emitted into the air by human activity in the U.S. In addition, 13.1% was emitted by coal-fired industrial and mixed-use commercial boilers, and 0.3% by coal-fired residential boilers, bringing the total U.S. mercury pollution due to coal combustion to 46% of the U.S. man-made mercury sources. In contrast, China's coal-fired power plants emitted an estimated 200 ± 90 tons of mercury in 1999, which was about 38% of Chinese human-generated mercury emissions (45% being emitted from non-ferrous metals smelting).  Mercury in emissions from power plants can be reduced by the use of activated carbon.

Public debate

Advocates 
In 2007 an advertising campaign was launched to improve public opinion on coal power titled America's Power.  This was done by the American Coalition for Clean Coal Electricity (then known as Americans for Balanced Energy Choices), a pro-coal organization started in 2000.

Opposition 
In the face of increasing electricity demand through the 2000s, the US has seen a "Growing Trend Against Coal-Fired Power Plants".  In 2005 the 790 MW Mohave Power Station closed rather than implement court ordered pollution controls. In 2006 through 2007 there was first a bullish market attitude towards coal with the expectation of a new wave of plants, but political barriers and pollution concerns escalated exponentially, which is likely to damage plans for new generation and put pressure on older plants. In 2007, 59 proposed coal plants were canceled, abandoned, or placed on hold by sponsors as a result of financing obstacles, regulatory decisions, judicial rulings, and new global warming legislation.

The Stop Coal campaign has called for a moratorium on the construction of any new coal plants and for the phase out of all existing plants, citing concern for global warming. Others have called for a carbon tax and a requirement of carbon sequestration for all coal power plants.

The creation in January 2009 of a Presidential task force (to look at ways to alter the energy direction of the United States energy providers) favors the trend away from coal-fired power plants.

Statistics

See also 
 Coal mining in the United States
 Mountaintop removal mining
 Superfund

References

External links 
 Carbon-emissions culprit? Coal.
 Clean Air Watch.
 State Coal Profile Index Map
 Coal production in the United States – an historical overview
 Is America Ready to Quit Coal?

Climate change in the United States
Coal in the United States
Electric power generation in the United States